Judo at the 2020 Summer Olympics in Tokyo featured around  judoka (柔道家: judo practitioners) competing in 15 events, seven each for both men and women as well as a new mixed team event. The 2020 Summer Olympics were postponed due to the COVID-19 pandemic, and the judo competitions were held in July 2021 at Nippon Budokan.

The tournament brackets were drawn on 23 July, with the top 8 judoka in each weight class seeded.

Qualification

Competition schedule

Participating nations

Source:

Competitors

Medal summary

Medal table

Men's events

Women's events

Mixed events

New rules 
Judo, the sports first introduced in 1964 Tokyo Olympics, has changed and evolved over time. There were several rule changes made to empower this sports in the 2020 Summer Olympics.

Based on the 2016 IJF Judo rule changes, the game time for men has shortened one minute and the length of a game became four minutes which is the same as women's game. There was also a change in scores of a Waza-Ari, a technic that requires a judoka to pin his/her opponent for 10 to 20 seconds or to throw the opponent successfully but not well-controlled to be awarded as Ippon. As basic Judo rules, there are three ways to win: 1)to throw the opponent to the ground in a certain efficiency, 2) to hold down the opponent for 20 seconds, 3) to force the opponent to submission by arm lock or strangulation. Originally, gaining points of Ippon ended the game but now Waza-aris are awarded equally to Ippons in the 2020 summer Olympics. With this rule change, penalty scores no longer ended the game.
In addition, the mixed team competition was added as a new content of Judo games in the Olympics. Six individuals in their national mixed team compete with individuals of the same weight category from another national team. A team wins when it won at least four rounds of six. This new content aims to engage in gender equality as well as a union through sport.

In addition, the mixed team competition was added as a new content of Judo games in the Olympics. Six individuals in their national mixed team compete with individuals of the same weight category from another national team. A team wins when it won at least four rounds of six. This new content aims to engage in gender equality as well as a union through sport. It is considered one of the most gender equal competition in Olympic games France, the next summer olympic host country, became the very first team to gain a gold medal for this new competition of mixed teams. It defeated Japan with 4-1. This was considered as a memorable moment of judo games in the 2020 Summer Olympics.

Politically motivated withdrawal
Selected to compete at the 2020 Summer Games in the -73 kg weight class, Algerian judoka Fethi Nourine and his coach Amar Benikhlef announced his withdrawal following the conclusion of the draw of competitors. 

Nourine was quoted as saying his political support for the Palestinian cause made it impossible for him to compete against an Israeli; Tohar Butbul, the #5 seed in the tournament, whom he was drawn to potentially face in the second round (had he won in the first round), was Israeli. 

The International Judo Federation (IJF) announced the immediate suspension of Nourine and his coach on 24 July 2021, pending a further investigation, while the Algerian Olympic Committee revoked their accreditation, and sent Nourine and his coach back home to Algeria. The Federation explained: "According to the IJF rules, in line with the Olympic Charter and especially with rule 50.2 that provides for the protection of the neutrality of sport at the Olympic Games and the neutrality of the Games themselves, which states that 'no kind of demonstration or political, religious or racial propaganda is permitted in any Olympic sites, venues or other areas,' Fethi Nourine and Amar Benikhlef are now suspended and will face a decision by the IJF Disciplinary Commission, as well as disciplinary sanctions by the National Olympic Committee of Algeria back in their country.'"

See also
Judo at the 2018 Asian Games
Judo at the 2019 Pan American Games
Judo at the 2020 Summer Paralympics
Judo wrap-up from the Tokyo 2020 Olympics

References

External links
 
 Results Book 

 
2020
2020 Summer Olympics events
Olympics
Olympics
Olympics 2021